Xerocrassa nyeli is a species of air-breathing land snail, a pulmonate gastropod mollusk in the family Geomitridae. 

Subspecies
 Xerocrassa nyeli nyeli (Mittre, 1842)
 Xerocrassa nyeli ponsi (Hidalgo, 1878)

Distribution

This species is endemic to Spain, where it is restricted to the Balearic island of Menorca.

References

nicosiana
Molluscs of Europe
Endemic fauna of the Balearic Islands
Gastropods described in 1842